Robert Paul Marie de Guise (5 June 1872 – 7 December 1940) was a colonial administrator in various colonies of the French Colonial Empire. While he was Governor of Guinea, he was described as a "negrophobe and a snob" who "hated being here." His diary from the time was full of passages that were equal parts "melancholy homesickness" and "racist ranting." During his brief tenure as governor of Guinea, he vetoed numerous proposals to improve infrastructure in the colony on the grounds that he thought it would be a waste of money and resources.

Titles Held

References

1872 births
1940 deaths
Governors of French Guinea
Governors of French Equatorial Africa
French Governors of Martinique
Governors of French India
People of French West Africa